Lucius Munatius Plancus was a Roman senator and consul.

A son of Lucius Munatius Plancus (consul in 42 BC), he became consul in 13 AD. In AD 14 he went as legate to Germany to help suppress the Rhine legions' mutiny with little success. He was married to Aemilia Paulla, daughter of Aemilius Lepidus Paullus.

References 
 Prosopographia Imperii Romani (PIR) ² M 729
 Cassius Dio, LVI 28.
 Suetonius, Vita divi Augusti 101.
 Tacitus, Annales I 39.

Senators of the Roman Empire
Imperial Roman consuls
1st-century Romans
Munatii